Sebastian Cavazza (born 18 March 1973) is a Slovenian actor. He has appeared in more than thirty films since 1991.

Selected filmography

References

External links 

1973 births
Living people
Film people from Kranj
Slovenian male film actors
Slovenian male stage actors
Slovenian male television actors